The men's 4×100 metres relay at the 2004 Summer Olympics as part of the athletics program was held at the Athens Olympic Stadium from August 27 to 28.  The sixteen teams competed in a two-heat qualifying round in which the first three teams from each heat, together with the next two fastest teams, were given a place in the final race.

The Great Britain quartet of Jason Gardener, Darren Campbell, Mark Lewis-Francis, and Marlon Devonish produced superior exchanges to beat the United States team by 0.01 seconds in a time of 38.07 seconds. The final also saw the U.S. team struggling with their relay duties, when Justin Gatlin and Coby Miller botched their baton handoff after the second leg, leaving the British team to command their lead towards the final bend. By the time Greene received the baton from Miller on the anchor leg, he burst down the home stretch to chase Lewis-Francis at the finish line, but could not get ahead despite his lower leg and head having crossed the line first, as the Americans fell short by just a hundredth of a second.

Records
, the existing World and Olympic records were as follows.

No new records were set during the competition.

Qualification
The qualification period for athletics was 1 January 2003 to 9 August 2004. A National Olympic Committee (NOC) could enter one qualified relay team per relay event, with a maximum of six athletes. For this event, an NOC would be invited to participate with a relay team if the average of the team's two best times, obtained in IAAF-sanctioned meetings or tournaments, would be among the best sixteen, at the end of this period.

Schedule
All times are Greece Standard Time (UTC+2)

Results

Round 1
Qualification rule: The first three teams in each heat (Q) plus the next two fastest overall (q) moved on to the final.

Heat 1

Heat 2

Final

References

External links
 IAAF Athens 2004 Olympic Coverage

M
Relay foot races at the Olympics
Men's events at the 2004 Summer Olympics